Ride to Hell: Retribution is an action-adventure game developed by Eutechnyx and published by Deep Silver. It was released for Microsoft Windows, PlayStation 3 and Xbox 360. 

Ride to Hell was originally announced in 2008 and was conceived as an open world game, before being quietly cancelled the same year. Stuck in development hell, developer Eutechnyx continued to develop it until its re-announcement five years later in 2013 dropping the open-world format in favour of a linear action game with combat and vehicle sections.

Ride to Hell was critically panned upon release and is considered one of the worst video games ever made. Critics condemned its broken and repetitive gameplay, poor controls, dated graphics, bad writing, poor voice acting, poor artificial intelligence, awkward sex scenes, offensive portrayal of women, numerous technical issues, and the developers cutting the originally planned open-world concept in favour of a linear layout.

Gameplay
The player controls Jake Conway from a third-person perspective. The game's levels generally begin with a motorcycle driving segment in which only forward movement is allowed and obstacles must be avoided by using ramps and powerslides. Impacts and collisions lead to either a checkpoint reset (the screen fades and the player is sent backward to the last clear stretch of road) or death. Combat can also occur in these segments, consisting of quick-time event melee attacks, shooting from a sidecar while an AI companion drives, or getting close enough to allow an AI companion to shoot.

The main levels generally consist of a mixture of third-person, cover-based shooter, and beat-'em-up gameplay. These levels are linear, usually guarded by several lower-level enemies with a high-ranking Devil's Hand member serving as the boss enemy at the end. The player can use a variety of guns and melee weapons, as well as throwing knives and dynamite. Unarmed combat actions include guard breaking, countering enemy attacks, context kills with environmental objects, and quick-time events based on instant takedowns. Weapons and ammunition can be scavenged from defeated enemies.

Between levels, the player can roam a small section of Dead End to sell drugs and buy weapons, moves, and motorcycle customization. Notably, despite a large amount of the city being modelled and detailed, any attempts to exit the small playable section results in a fade-reset similar to that of the driving segments. Also notable is that civilian NPCs are animated, but cannot be spoken to or killed, despite the game's warning against harming such NPCs.

Plot
In 1969, Vietnam veteran Jake Conway returns home to his family of plains bikers, which include his uncle Mack and brother Mikey. Mikey has grown distant from his brother and shows disdain for his uncle, but is infatuated with his college friend and tutor, Ellie, who likes bands. Mikey leaves angered when Mack refuses to allow him to go to a concert with Ellie. Mack sends Jake after him, and after consoling him, they go to a diner. Outside, Mikey is confronted by The Devil's Hand biker gang. Jake intervenes as Devil's Hand member Colt notices Mikey's jacket, causing a chase. The Devil's Hand holds the brothers at gunpoint, demanding to know where they got the jacket until Meathook threatens Mikey with a knife. Mikey says the original wearer of the jacket was his and Jake's father, William Conway (whom Meathook recognizes as "Toledo" Conway). Meathook slits Mikey's throat, and as Jake mourns his brother, he is shot and left for dead by Colt. 

Jake survives the bullet wound and is patched up by Mack. Jake swears vengeance on the Devil's Hand gang and hunts the bikers one by one. Mack helps Jake find Anvil, who is revealed to be in San Alfonso, where he escapes after being discovered. Jake then goes to Army Officer Tyrell, who gives him weapons after proving himself. Anvil ambushes Mack and Jake but escapes after they deal with his henchman. Jake hunts down Anvil and kills him. Ellie contacts Jake and tells him about Dr. Blotter, who does dealings with Colt. Blotter sends him to Fogwood to meet with Colt's lover, Naomi. In Fogwood, Jake saves Naomi from Bar Loggers, the two have sex, and she later tells him Colt's location—Seven Wells Ranch. 

Killing bikers, thugs, and policemen, Jake enters the Ranch but is subdued when he shoots fuel canisters, leading Colt to escape to Airplane Cemetery. Jake makes it to the Cemetery, tells Colt to remember Mikey's name, and kills him. Jake then searches for bikers Greasy Steve and Meathook at a boxing ring. Jake fights the four competitors: Bullseye, Ace, Selvan the Destroyer, and Meathook himself. Jake wins all fights and interrogates Meathook, but is stopped when Greasy Steve kills Meathook, leaving to speak to Triple 6. Jake hunts down Greasy Steve, leading him to a death race where the two battle. Jake wins and interrogates him, getting information on their leader, Pretty Boy. Jake leaves Steve to explode with his own C4. Triple 6 confronts Jake to kill him, but Mack ambushes the Devil's Hands as Jake kills the bikers, and Triple 6 escapes the scene.

Ellie reveals that Triple 6's location is in Fogwood Silverfalls Sawmill with his family. Jake later kills Triple 6 as he helps a lumberjack and prostitutes find Pretty Boy, leading him to King Dick. Going to King Dick's Church, Jake kills his henchman and interrogates him for Pretty Boy's location. King Dick tells him to find Brandy; he also tells of their leader, Caesar, who wanted to hunt him down due to his father. Jake drowns King Dick in a baptismal fountain and leaves to find Brandy. Brandy asks Jake to win a race and get Orson's bike down in Bergenstock mines for him to get paid. Jake gets the bike and goes to Tyrell for explosives. Brandy takes the bike to Pretty Boy as Jake and Mack intercept them, leading to Pretty Boy being captured by them. During his interrogation, Pretty Boy tells that his father is dead and that there's been a kill order on him and his family. 

At Mikey's grave, Mack tells Jake the truth: William was friends with Mack, and Caesar who was part of The Retribution Gang. William and Caesar raced for a girl. William won and had children with her. Despite his love for Jake and Mikey's mother, William gambled her and drank heavily, leading Caesar to become ruthless and start his own group with drugs—The Devil's Hand. William ran away with his wife and gave his sons to Mack, telling him not to tell them of their circumstances. Caesar and William did one last bet for her, but William lost and double-crossed Caesar, leading him to kill them by throwing them off a cliff.

After Mack has a near-death at the cemetery, The Devil's Hand steal one of Tyrell's shipments and assault Mack and Ellie's location. Jake finds Mack hanged and Ellie captured by Caesar. Getting to Caesar's compound, Jake saves Ellie as Caesar reveals that Ellie is his daughter, who ran away fleeing his abuse of her and her mother. Caesar tells Jake of his father's last bet with him and killing them, leading Jake to fight Caesar. Caesar escapes as Jake and Ellie give chase. During the chase, Jake gets the drop on Caesar, knocking him off his bike onto a cliff, where the bike explodes, killing him. Jake recovers Ellie, and the two walk away from the scene.

Development
Deep Silver Vienna planned to use a film-style production model to develop this game together with Eutechnyx, a Gateshead-based independent games studio, as well as several other contributors.

It was originally conceived as an open-world game, allowing the driving of a large range of motorbikes and cars and various forms of combat (hand-to-hand and with guns, both on foot and on a bike) through the deserts and towns of late-1960s California. Concept art was provided for the lead characters by Massive Black. A story was written, dialogue recorded, and cut scenes completely motion-captured for this first incarnation of the game, and much of the vehicles, world, and locations were created (at least to an early stage) over the several years this first incarnation was in development.

Ride to Hell: Retribution was originally announced in 2008, as Ride to Hell and due for release in 2009 according to an early trailer. However, various gaming websites such as IGN reported Ride to Hell as canceled. The game was removed from Deep Silver's website. Development continued at Eutechnyx without the involvement of Deep Silver Vienna (which was closed down in early 2010) and the design was heavily revised, losing the open-world elements of the game and splitting it into several titles.

In February 2013, the game was classified R18+ by the Australian Classification Board signalling that the game may be headed for release. In March, another ACB classification was filed with the name "Cook's Mad Recipe", also sharing the same file number and numerous other details as the previous classification but this name was to be applied to downloadable content planned to be available for the game on or after launch.

In April, Ride to Hell resurfaced as three games sharing the same theme and branding: Ride to Hell: Retribution on PlayStation 3, Xbox 360, and PC, a beat-em-up with a biker theme, handled by Eutechnyx and was released on 25 June; Ride to Hell: Route 666 on PSN (PlayStation 3) and XBLA (Xbox 360), focusing on road combat, and handled by Black Forest Games; and Ride to Hell: Beatdown, aimed at mobile platforms.

Reception

Ride to Hell: Retribution received "overwhelming dislike", according to the review aggregator website Metacritic. The site calculated weighted average ratings ranging between 13/100 and 19/100, depending on the platform. It has been panned by critics for its broken  and repetitive gameplay,  poor controls,  dated graphics, poor voice acting and writing, poor artificial intelligence, numerous bugs and glitches, excessive use of quick-time events, awkward sex scenes with the characters fully clothed, negative portrayal of women and use of a linear structure instead of the originally announced open world element.

EGM said: "Other games may have offered less content for more money or come up shorter in specific, individual areas, but I don’t think there’s ever been a game that does so many things so universally poorly". The site rated it 0.5, with no positive remarks about the gameplay.

Dan Ryckert of Game Informer said that "with the exception of some Kinect and Wii games that flat-out don't work, this is the worst video game I’ve played within this console generation".

Daniel Starkey of GameSpot gave the game 1/10, calling it a "hideous, slapped-together action game saturated with poor, nonsensical design choices". It became the second game after Big Rigs: Over the Road Racing to get GameSpot's lowest possible score. 

Steve Hannley of Hardcore Gamer gave the game 1/5, calling it "an offensive abomination of a game".

Giant Bomb awarded it the Worst Game of 2013.

Eurogamer rated the game 1/10. Reviewer Cara Ellison criticized the game's portrayal of women: "...women are completely, totally, transparently, a resource in this game". The treatment of women was also raised in Phil Iwaniuk's review for Official PlayStation Magazine (UK). Iwaniuk called the game "obnoxiously misogynistic".

Ben "Yahtzee" Croshaw of The Escapist called it "explosively, apocalyptically bad" in his Zero Punctuation review of the game, but drew a comparison to Plan 9 from Outer Space, explaining that the game's issues were entertaining enough to warrant a purchase. He later refused to place it in his listing of 2013's worst games because he considered it a "congealed failure" rather than a game, instead awarding it his "Lifetime Achievement Award for Total Abhorrence", further explaining that "releasing every box with no disc inside would have been less of a mistake". He later refused to rank it among his worst games of the decade in a similar fashion.

References

2013 video games
Action-adventure games
Eutechnyx games
Motorcycle video games
Organized crime video games
PlayStation 3 games
Video games developed in the United Kingdom
Video games set in 1969
Video games set in the United States
Windows games
Xbox 360 games
Fiction set in 1969
Deep Silver games
Unreal Engine games
Video games about revenge
Works about outlaw motorcycle clubs
Single-player video games